Solidarity Front for the People of Indochina (in Swedish: Solidaritetsfronten för Indokinas Folk) was an organization in Sweden, created by KFML(r) to mobilize support for the liberation struggles of the Indochinese people. SFIF was formed following the expulsion/departure of the KFML(r) supporters from the major Vietnam solidarity movement DFFG, which was led by KFML.

The pro-KFML(r) fraction within DFFG had argued that DFFG had to take a stand in Swedish class struggle issues simultaneously as supporting the struggles in Indochina.

SFIF published Vietnam-Solidaritet (external publication) and Klassolidaritet (internal publication).

SFIF was dissolved in 1972, and merged into the Young Communist League of Sweden (marxist-leninists).

Political organizations based in Sweden
Anti–Vietnam War groups